Ẑ is a Latin script letter, the letter Z with a circumflex,  used for transliteration of the Cyrillic letter Ѕ in ISO 9 family of transliteration standards. The lower case version of the letter is ẑ.

In mathematics, ẑ often refers to the unit vector in the +Z direction.

References 

Z-circumflex